Mount Charleston, including Charleston Peak (Nuvagantu, literally "where snow sits", in Southern Paiute or Nüpakatütün in Shoshoni) at , is the highest mountain in both the Spring Mountains and Clark County, in Nevada, United States. It is the eighth-highest mountain in the state. Well separated from higher peaks by large, low basins, Charleston Peak is the most topographically prominent peak in Nevada, and the eighth-most-prominent peak in the contiguous United States. It is one of eight ultra-prominent peaks in Nevada.

Overview
Mount Charleston is a year-round getaway for Las Vegas's residents and visitors, with a number of hiking trails, a modest ski area, a hotel and a small restaurant.  The mountain, which is snow-capped more than half the year, can be seen from parts of the Las Vegas Strip when looking toward the west.  Mount Charleston has nearly 200 camp sites and over 150 picnic areas, some of which are RV-accessible.

The village of Mount Charleston, Nevada, lies at its base to the east.

The state of Nevada issues license plates with the caption "Mt. Charleston" and an image of the peak in the background. Sales of the plate supports the natural environment of the Mount Charleston area through grants administered by the Nevada Division of State Lands.

According to the Federal Writers' Project, Mount Charleston was named for Charleston, South Carolina by Southern sympathizers.

Plane crash
Near its summit are the remnants of the 1955 crash of a CIA C-54 Military Air Transport Service plane. The plane was on route on November 17, 1955, from Burbank (location of Lockheed's Skunkworks), to Groom Lake (Area 51) (then known as Watertown Strip) to work on the secret U-2 plane development. Fourteen men (a mix of military staffers and civilian subcontractors, engineers, and technicians) were on board when it crashed during a blizzard, all of whom died. There are still remains from the plane that can be hiked to just off the main southern loop trail to the peak.

The Silent Heroes of the Cold War Memorial was installed at the Spring Mountains Visitor Gateway in 2015. It features a propeller from the downed aircraft (which was recovered decades later from the crash site) and a granite monument.

Hiking 

Charleston Peak is a popular destination for hikers. The summit offers panoramic views from the Sierra Nevada, Death Valley, and Las Vegas. There are two well-marked and well-maintained trails to the summit: South Loop Trail  and North Loop Trail. The trails can be done on their own as an out-and-back hike, or combined as a loop. Both approaches involve a strenuous 16-mile+ round trip with over 4000 feet of climbing. The hike often takes all day. The hike is most accessible in the snow-free months of summer and fall.

See also

List of Ultras of the United States
Carpenter 1 Fire
Mahogany Fire

References

External links

 

Charleston
Charleston
Charleston
Charleston
Tourist attractions in the Las Vegas Valley